A list of films produced in France in 1954.

See also
 1954 in France

References

External links
 French films of 1954 at the Internet Movie Database
French films of 1954 at Cinema-francais.fr

1954
Films
French